Nicolaes is a given name that is spelled Nicolaas in modern Dutch.

Notable people 
Nicolaes Pieterszoon Berchem (1620–1683), Dutch Golden Age painter
Nicolaes Boddingius (1605–1669), Dutch schoolmaster, writer and minister
Nicolaes Borremans (c. 1614 – 1679), Dutch preacher
Nicolaes Cave (fl 1619 – 1651), Flemish painter
Nicolaes Coeckebacker (fl.1633–1639), Chief of the Dutch trading factory at Hirado, Japan
 (fl.1500–1507), Flemish composer
Nicolaes Hals (1628–1686), Dutch painter
Nicolaes Couckebacker (1600s), Dutch factory chief
Nicolaes Geelvinck (1706–1764), Dutch landowner and mayor of Amsterdam
Nicolaes Gillis (1595–1632), Dutch painter
Nicolaes Hals (1628–1686), Dutch painter
Nicolaes Jonghelinck (1517–1570), Flemish merchant banker and art collector
Nicolaes à Kempis (c.1600–1676), Flemish composer active in Brussels
Nicolaes Lachtropius (1640–1700), Dutch painter
Nicolaes Lastman (1585–1625), Dutch painter
Nicolaes Latombe (1616–1676), Dutch painter
Nicolaes Lauwers (1600–1652), Flemish engraver
Nicolaes Maes (1634–1693), Dutch painter
Nicolaes Millich (1629–1699), Dutch sculptor
Nicolaes Molenaer (1630–1676), Dutch painter
Nicolaes Moyaert (1592–1655), Dutch painter
Nicolaes Pickenoy (1588 – 1653/1656), Dutch painter
Nicolaes Pitau (1632–1671), Flemish-born French engraver and printmaker, son of Nicolaes Lauwers
Nicolaes Roose, alias of Nicolaas de Liemaker (1601–1646), Flemish historical painter
Nicolaes Ruts (1573–1638, German merchant
Nicolaes Tulp (1593–1674), Dutch surgeon and politician
Nicolaes Vallet (c.1583–c.1642), French-born Dutch lutenist and composer
Nicolaes Visscher I (1618–1679), Dutch engraver and cartographer
Nicolaes Visscher II (1649–1702), Dutch engraver and cartographer
Nicolaes Willingh (1640–1678), Dutch painter
Nicolaes Witsen (1641–1717), Dutch statesman, ambassador, cartographer and writer on shipbuilding
Nicolaes Woutersz van der Meer (1575–1666), Dutch politician
Nicolaes de Bruyn (1571–1656), Flemish engraver
Nicolaes de Giselaer (1583–c.1654), Dutch painter
Nicolaes de Helt Stockade (1614–1669), Dutch painter
Nicolaes de Kemp (1574–1647), Dutch painter
Nicolaes de Vree (1645–1702), Dutch painter
Nicolaes van Gelder (1636–1676), Dutch painter
Nicolaes van Hoorn (c.1635–1683), Dutch pirate
Nicolaes van Rensselaer (1636–1678), Dutch clergyman in New Netherland
Nicolaes van Verendael (1640–1691), Flemish painter

People portrayed by Frans Hals 

 Nicolaes Pietersz Duyst van Voorhout (1599/1600–1650), Dutch brewer
 Nicolaes le Febure (1589–1641), Dutch mayor of Haarlem
 Nicolaes Grisz Grauwert (1582–1658), Dutch guard
 Nicolaes Hasselaer (1593–1635), Dutch brewer
 Nicolaes van Loo (1607–1641), Dutch brewer
 Nicolaes Woutersz van der Meer (1575–1666), Dutch brewer and mayor of Haarlem
 Nicolaes Olycan (1599–1639), Dutch brewer
 Nicolaes Verbeek (1582–1637), Dutch brewer

See also

Nicolaas
Nicolaos Matussis
Nicolas